The 22851/52 Santragachi–Mangalore Central Vivek Express is a Superfast Express train belonging to Indian Railways South Eastern Zone that runs between  and  in India.

It operates as train number 22851 from Santragachi to Mangalore Central and as train number 22852 in the reverse direction, serving the states of West Bengal, Odisha, Andhra Pradesh, Tamil Nadu, Kerala & Karnataka.

Coaches
The 22851/52 Santragachi–Mangalore Central Vivek Express has Two AC 2-tier,  Six AC 3-tier, 10 sleeper class, Two General Unreserved & Two End on Generation (EOG) Coaches. It does not carry a pantry car.

As is customary with most train services in India, coach composition may be amended at the discretion of Indian Railways depending on demand.

Service

As the average speed of the train is above , as per railway rules, its fare includes a Superfast surcharge.
This would be the only Vivek Express with Superfast tag hence the fastest Vivek Express.

Routing
The 22851 / 52 Santragachi–Mangalore Central Vivek Express important stops are:-

Traction

Reverse

Train Is reverse in Visakhapatnam

Rake composition

 2 AC II Tier
 6 AC III Tier
 10 Sleeper Coaches 

 2 General Unreserved 
 2 End on Generation (EOG) Coaches

References

External links
22851 Vivek Express at India Rail Info
22852 Vivek Express at India Rail Info

Rail transport in Howrah
Rail transport in West Bengal
Rail transport in Odisha
Rail transport in Andhra Pradesh
Rail transport in Tamil Nadu
Rail transport in Kerala
Rail transport in Karnataka
Transport in Mangalore
Vivek Express trains